Goroka Urban LLG is a local-level government (LLG) of Eastern Highlands Province, Papua New Guinea.

Wards
80. Goroka Urban
85. Bihute

References

Local-level governments of Eastern Highlands Province